Spalato is the Italian name for the city of Split, Croatia.

Spalato may also refer to:

 Province of Spalato, a former Italian province encompassing Split
 Spalato railway, a part of the former narrow-gauge railways in Bosnia and Herzegovina
 SMS Spalato, a torpedo cruiser of the Austro-Hungarian Navy
 Italian destroyer Spalato, a previous name for the Yugoslav destroyer Split